Katherine Willis is an American actress and producer, best known for her roles as Myrtle Hale in Killers of the Flower Moon, Diana Lord in Tell Me Your Secrets, and Joanne Street in Friday Night Lights.

Early life and education
Willis spent most of her childhood on a 200 acre farm in southwest Missouri.

She studied theater and film at Brigham Young University with a theater Talent Award Scholarship. She settled in Austin, Texas, in 1994 where most of her studio film and television credits are from.

Filmography

Film

Television

References

External links
 
 

American television actresses
American film actresses
Living people
Brigham Young University alumni
Actresses from Austin, Texas
20th-century American actresses
21st-century American actresses
Year of birth missing (living people)